Reza Nakhaie Jazar also known as Reza N. Jazar is a professor of Mechanical engineering at RMIT University.

Education 
Reza received his master's degree from Tehran Polytechnic in 1990, specializing in robotics. He acquired his PhD from Sharif University of Technology in Nonlinear Dynamics and Applied Mathematics, in 1997.

Career 
Professor Jazar served as the Associate Dean and Head of the Mechanical and Automotive Engineering discipline at RMIT in Melbourne, Victoria 2010-2020.

He is the founder of the Journal of Nonlinear Engineering, and he has been its editor-in-chief for 2012-2018.

Select book publications

References

External links

Iranian mechanical engineers
Living people
Year of birth missing (living people)
Place of birth missing (living people)
Academic staff of RMIT University
Sharif University of Technology alumni